Strip map and sample is a method of archaeological excavation applied in the United Kingdom to preserve archaeological remains by record in the face of development threat. It involves machine stripping of an area, plotting observed features onto a site plan and then partially excavating those features (sampling).

Strip map and sample is undertaken when a site is to be destroyed by development and no satisfactory method of preserving archaeological remains in situ can be devised or adequate funding and time has not been factored into development project planning to allow for a full archaeological investigation.

See also
Excavation

Methods in archaeology